Christopher Kane (born 5 September 1994) is a Scottish professional footballer who plays as a striker for Scottish Premiership club St Johnstone.

Career

St Johnstone
Kane made his debut for St Johnstone against Kilmarnock on 9 November 2013. On 24 May 2015, Kane scored his first ever goal for St Johnstone, the winner in a 1–0 win over Aberdeen which secured a fourth-placed finish for the Perth club.

On 29 January 2018, Kane scored a hat-trick in a 4–0 away win versus Albion Rovers in the Scottish Cup fourth round at Cliftonhill.

Kane was one of three St Johnstone players to sign a short term six-month contract extension in May 2020, as the club formulated plans amid the ongoing coronavirus pandemic.

Loan spells
In January 2014, Kane signed for Scottish Championship club Dumbarton on a one-month loan deal, scoring on his debut as the Sons defeated Greenock Morton 2–0 on 4 January 2014. On 31 January 2014, his loan was extended until the end of that season. On 29 August 2014, Kane returned to Dumbarton on loan once again, agreeing a deal until January 2015. Kane scored the winner on his second debut for the Sons versus Livingston.

On 10 August 2017, Kane along with his teammate Jason Kerr joined Scottish Championship club Queen of the South on loan until 31 January 2018. On 14 January 2018, Kane was recalled to the Perth club when his loan spell in Dumfries with the Doonhamers ended.

Career statistics

Honours
St Johnstone
Scottish Cup: 2020–21
Scottish League Cup: 2020–21

References

External links

1994 births
Association football forwards
St Johnstone F.C. players
Dumbarton F.C. players
Queen of the South F.C. players
Living people
Scottish footballers
Scottish Professional Football League players
Footballers from Edinburgh